Ametropic amblyopia is a medical condition in which the retina cannot focus on the image of a distant object, a condition often described as reduced visual acuity. This is due to large uncorrected refractive errors in the patient's optic system of the eyes. Astigmatism is one of the most frequent causes of ametropic amblyopia.

References

Further reading
Moseley, Merrick J., et al. "Effectiveness of occlusion therapy in ametropic amblyopia: a pilot study." British Journal of Ophthalmology 81.11 (1997): 956–961.

Abraham, S. V. "Bilateral ametropic amblyopia." J Pediatr Ophthalmol Strabismus 1 (1964): 57–61.
Werner, D. B., and W. E. Scott. "Amblyopia case reports--bilateral hypermetropic ametropic amblyopia." Journal of pediatric ophthalmology and strabismus 22.5 (1984): 203–205.

Disorders of choroid and retina
Ophthalmology